Osca lata,  the coliguacho or black horse fly, is a large horse fly whose range includes southern Chile and southern Argentina. The fly has a striking reddish-orange coloration on the side of its thorax and abdomen.  It is generally around 2 cm. in adult size.

Like most species of horse flies, the females of Scaptia lata need to feed on mammalian blood before they can produce eggs.

References

Tabanidae
Diptera of South America
Insects described in 1835
Taxa named by Félix Édouard Guérin-Méneville